Karl Enzler (born 29 March 1925) was a German ice hockey player. He competed in the men's tournament at the 1952 Winter Olympics.

References

External links
 
 

1925 births
Possibly living people
Olympic ice hockey players of Germany
Ice hockey players at the 1952 Winter Olympics
Sportspeople from Garmisch-Partenkirchen